Rabenosyn-5 is a protein that in humans is encoded by the ZFYVE20 gene.

Interactions
ZFYVE20 has been shown to interact with RAB5A.

References

Further reading